The Roman Catholic Diocese of Arras (–Boulogne–Saint-Omer) (Latin: Dioecesis Atrebatensis (–Bononiena–Audomarensis); French: Diocèse d'Arras (–Boulogne–Saint-Omer)) is a diocese of the Latin Church of the Roman Catholic Church in France. The episcopal see is the Arras Cathedral, in the city of Arras. The diocese encompasses all of the Department of Pas-de-Calais, in the Region of Nord-Pas-de-Calais.

The most significant jurisdictional changes all occurred during the Napoleonic wars. From 1802 to 1841, the diocese was suffragan of the Archdiocese of Paris, shifting away from the Archdiocese of Cambrai, after Napoleon dissolved the massive Archdiocese. After the defeat of Napoleon, the Napoleonic Concordat united the diocese of Arras, diocese of Saint-Omer and diocese of Boulogne together in one much larger diocese. Unlike most of the other dioceses immediately restored, it was not until 1841 that the diocese returned as a suffragan to the Archdiocese of Cambrai.

History
A person named Martin is said to have evangelized Artois and Arras, capital of the Celtic Atrebates  by 350AD; however, these early Christian communities did not survive the barbarian invasions of the Roman Empire in the fifth century.

At the beginning of the sixth century Remigius, Archbishop of Reims, placed in the See of Arras St. Vedastus (St. Vaast) (d. c. 540), who had been the teacher of the Merovingian king Clovis I after the victory of Tolbiac. His successors, Dominicus and Vedulphus, are also both venerated as saints. After the death of Vedulphus, the See of Arras was transferred to Cambrai, and it was not until 1093 that Arras again became a diocese. At the time of the reform of the bishoprics of the Netherlands in 1559,  the diocese had 422 parishes.  Its metropolitan was changed from Reims to Cambrai by Pope Paul IV.

Before the French Revolution the Cathedral Chapter consisted of the Provost, the Dean, the  Archdeacon of Arras (Artois), the Archdeacon of Ostrevant, the Treasurer, the Penitentiary, 40 canons and 52 chaplains.  There were some 400 parishes and 12 rural deans.

King Philip II of Spain and Pope Pius IV founded the University of Douai in 1562 as a weapon in the Counterreformation and the French Wars of Religion.  The Jesuits had a college at Douai, founded in 1599, and suppressed in 1762.

During the French revolution the diocese of Arras was abolished and subsumed into a new diocese, the 'Pas de Calais', coterminous with the new 'Departement of the Pas-de-Calais', and a suffragan of the 'Metropole des Côtes de la Manche'. The clergy were required to swear and oath to the Constitution, and under the terms of the Civil Constitution of the Clergy a new bishop was to be elected by all the voters of the departement. This placed them in schism with the Roman Catholic Church and the Pope.  On 27 March 1791 the electors chose, on the fourth ballot, the curé of Saint-Nicolas-sur-les-Fossés at Arras,  Pierre-Joseph Porion.  In September 1801 First Consul Bonaparte abolished the Constitutional Church and signed a Concordat with Pope Pius VII which restored the Roman Catholic Church in France.  The diocese of Arras was restored.

Among the bishops of Arras were Cardinal Antoine Perrenot de Granvelle, Councillor of the emperor Charles V, Bishop of Arras from 1545 to 1562, later Archbishop of Mechelen and Viceroy of Naples;  François Richardot, a celebrated preacher, Bishop of Arras from 1562 to 1575; and Monseigneur Parisis (d. 1866), who figured prominently in the political assemblies of 1848.

The current ratio of Catholics to priests is 4,168.5 to 1.

Bishops
 Vedastus 499–540
 Dominicus 540–545
 Vedulphus 545–580

1095–1300

 Lambert 1095–1115
 Robert I 1115–1131
 Alvise 1131–1148
 Godescalc 1150–1161
 André de Paris 1161–1173
 Robert II 1173–1174
 Fremold 1174–1183
 Pierre I 1184–1203
 Raoul de Neuville 1203–1221
 Pontius (Ponce) 1221 – 2 September 1231
 Asso (Asson) 1231 – 27 March 1245
 Fursaeus (Fursy) 1245 – 1 April 1247
 Jacques de Dinant 1248–1259
 Pierre de Noyon 1259–1280
 Guillaume d'Isy 1282–1293
 Jean Lemoine 1293–1294
 Gérard Pigalotti 1296–1316

1300 to 1500

 Bernard 1317–1320
 Pierre de Chappes 1320–1326
 Jean du Plessis-Pasté 1326–1328
 Thierry Larchier d'Hirson 1328
 Pierre Roger, 1328–1329, later Pope Clement VI
 André Ghini de Malpighi 18 December 1329 – 12 September 1334 (translated to Tournai)
 Jean Mandevilain 12 September 1334 – 15 February 1339  (translated to Châlons-sur-Marne)
 Pierre Bertrand 1339–1344
 Aimery de Beaufort 1344–1361
 Gérard de Dainville 1362–1369
 Adhémar Robert 1369 – 6 June 1371 (translated to Therouanne)
 Hugues Faidit  6 June 1371 – 1372
 Pierre Masuyer 11 July 1374 – 1391
 Jean Canard 6 September 1392 – 7 October 1407 (Avignon Obedience)
 Martin Poré, O.P.   24 November 1407 – 1426 (Avignon Obedience)
 Hugues de Cayeu 16 December 1426 – 13 January 1438
 Fortigaire de Plaisance 1438–1452
 Jacques de Portugal 1453
 Denis de Montmorency 1453
 Jean Jouffroy 1453–1462
 Pierre de Ranchicourt 1463–1499
 Jean Gavet 1499–1501

1500 to 1800

 Nicolas Le Ruistre 1501–1509
 François de Melun 15 July 1510 – 26 November 1516  (translated to Therouanne)
 Philippe de Luxembourg 1516–1518
  Cardinal Pietro Accolti, Administrator 10 March 1518 – 8 December 1523
 Eustache de Croy 1524–1538
 Antoine Perrenot de Granvelle 1538 – 10 March 1561
 François Richardot 1561–1574
 Mathieu Moulart 1575 – 11 July 1601
 Jean du Ploich 1601–1602
 Jean Richardot 1602–1610
 Hermann van Ortemberg 1611–1626
 Paul Boudot 1626–1635
 Nicolas Duffif 1635–1651
 Jean Le Camus 1651–1652
 Ladislas Jonart nominated 1652 but never installed
 Étienne Moreau 1656–1670
 Guy de Sève de Rochechouart 1670–1724
 François Baglion de La Salle 1725–1752
 Jean de Bonneguise 1752–1769
 Louis François Marc Hilaire de Conzié 1769–1790
Pierre-Joseph Porion. 
Mathieu Asselin

From 1800

 Hugues-Robert-J.-Ch. De La Tour d’Auvergne Lauragais 1802–1851
 Pierre Louis Parisis 1851–1866
 Jean-Baptiste Joseph Lequette 1866–1882
 Guillaume René Meignan 1882–1884, also Archbishop of Tours 
 Desiré-Joseph Dennel 1884–1891
 Alfred-Casimir-Alexis Williez 1892–1911
 Émile-Louis Cornil Lobbedey 1911–1916
 Eugène Julien 1917–1930
 Henri-Edouard Dutoit 1930–1945
 Victor-Jean Perrin 1945–1961
 Gérard-Maurice Eugène Huyghe 1961–1984
 Henri-Fr.-M.-P. Derouet 1985–1998
 Jean-Paul Jaeger 1998–2020
 Olivier Leborgne 2020–present

See also
Catholic Church in France

References

Bibliography

Reference works
 pp. 495–496. (Use with caution; obsolete)
  (in Latin) pp. 115–116.
 (in Latin) p. 98.
 p. 122.
 pp. 99–100.
 p. 104.
 p. 105.

Studies

 2 vols.

Lotte Kéry: Die Errichtung des Bistums Arras 1093/1094. (Beihefte der Francia, 33). Thorbecke, Sigmaringen 1994,  (Online)

Tock, Benoît-Michel (1991). Les chartes des évêques d'Arras (1093-1203)  Paris : CTHS, 1991.
Tock, Benoît-Michel (1991). Les chartes promulguées par le chapitre cathédral d'Arras au XIIe siècle Turnholt : Brepols.
Tock, Benoît-Michel ; Ludovicus Milis (2000). Monumenta Arroasiensia   Turnholt : Brepols, 2000.

  A forgery:

External links
Goyau, Georges. "Arras." The Catholic Encyclopedia. Vol. 1. New York: Robert Appleton Company, 1907. Retrieved: 2016-09-02.

Acknowledgment

Arras
Arras
6th-century establishments in Francia